Ruislip Gardens is a London Underground station. It lies on the Central line, between West Ruislip and South Ruislip, in Travelcard Zone 5. The closest stations on the Metropolitan line and Piccadilly line are Ruislip and Ruislip Manor.  The station serves RAF Northolt.

History 
The tracks through the station were laid by part of the Great Western and Great Central Joint Railway with services starting on 2 April 1906 although there was no station at Ruislip Gardens at that time. The station opened on 9 July 1934.

As part of the 1935-40 New Works Programme, Central line services were projected westwards from a new junction, west of North Acton on the line to Ealing Broadway. The original intention was to extend the service as far as Denham, but work was delayed by World War II and the formation of the Metropolitan Green Belt after the war and so the terminus of the extension was cut back to West Ruislip, with services starting on 21 November 1948.

The main line services stopping at Ruislip Gardens ceased on 21 July 1958 and the station closed, leaving only the Central line services in place.  Until recently the entrance to a passenger stairwell was visible on the London-bound side of the Chiltern tracks.

The station today 
The station has an island platform layout.  Some services start or terminate here rather than West Ruislip, the trains leaving or entering the Central line depot to the west of the station, south of the running lines.  There is a link from the Central line depot for stock movement to the Metropolitan line just to the west of Ruislip via a shunting neck.

A running link round the southern boundary of the depot has several times been proposed, to make a connection with the Metropolitan line.  This would allow through running of Central line trains onwards from Ruislip Gardens to Uxbridge, but nothing has ever come of these suggestions.

Local places of note 
RAF Northolt and a Polish War Memorial are also close by.

In popular culture 
The station achieved poetic immortality in John Betjeman's poem Middlesex:

Gaily into Ruislip Gardens
Runs the red electric train,
With a thousand Ta's and Pardon's
Daintily alights Elaine;
Hurries down the concrete station
With a frown of concentration,
Out into the outskirt's edges
Where a few surviving hedges
Keep alive our lost Elysium – Rural Middlesex again.

Connections
London Buses route E7 and school route 696 serve the station.

Gallery

References

External links
 London Transport Museum Photographic Archive
 
 
 

Central line (London Underground) stations
Tube stations in the London Borough of Hillingdon
Railway stations in Great Britain opened in 1934
Former Great Western and Great Central Joint Railway stations